The Colorado Buffaloes football team represents the University of Colorado at Boulder in the Pac-12 Conference at the NCAA Division I FBS  level in college football.  The following are the yearly results, game-by-game yearly results, and detailed bowl results.

Yearly results

Bowl games

References

Colorado Buffaloes

Colorado Buffaloes football